Les Stevens may refer to:

 Les Stevens (footballer) (1920–1991), English footballer
 Les Stevens (boxer) (born 1951), English boxer